The Philippine House Committee on Public Information, or House Public Information Committee is a standing committee of the Philippine House of Representatives.

Jurisdiction 
As prescribed by House Rules, the committee's jurisdiction is on the dissemination and production of information to the public through all forms of which includes the following:
 Advertising
 Cable television
 Internet
 Movie and television
 Print and broadcast media
 Video

This also includes their regulation and the rights and responsibilities of the entities and persons engaged therein.

Members, 18th Congress

See also 
 House of Representatives of the Philippines
 List of Philippine House of Representatives committees

References

External links 
House of Representatives of the Philippines

Public Information